Radio Orania is a South African community radio station based in the Northern Cape. The coverage area is Orania, a town in the Northern Cape, although some reception is possible as far as Hopetown.

Programmes are broadcast in Afrikaans language, from 5 am to 4 pm and 5 to 10 pm. The Orania community is the target audience. Programme format includes about 40% music and 60% talk.

The radio station was launched on 12 April 2008, after its predecessor Radio 100 had been shut down by ICASA. The station is manned by volunteers only, counting over 50 contributors.

Programmes include readings of Afrikaans literature such as Mikro's Die ruiter in die nag. A 13-year-old student at Orania's Volkskool made local news in 2009, when his radio play about Battle of Majuba was broadcast by the station.

Listenership figures

Notes

References

External links
SAARF Website
Sentech Website

Afrikaans-language radio stations
Community radio stations in South Africa
Orania, Northern Cape
Radio stations established in 2008
Mass media in the Northern Cape